The Argus bare-eye (Phlegopsis barringeri) is a species of bird in the family Thamnophilidae.
Known only from a single male specimen taken in 1951 in Colombia, its taxonomic validity is questionable, and most authorities do not recognize it, following Willis (1979) and Graves (1992), where it was shown to be a hybrid between the black-spotted and the reddish-winged bare-eye.

References
 Graves, G. R. (1992). Diagnosis of a hybrid antbird (Phlegopsis nigromaculata X Phlegopsis erythroptera) and the rarity of hybridization among suboscines. Proc. Biol. Soc. Wash. 105: 834–340.
 Willis, E. O. (1979). Comportamento e ecologia da mãe-da-taóca, Phlegopsis nigromaculata (D'Orbigny & Lafresnaye)(Aves, Formicariidae). Revista Brasileira de Biologia. 39 (1): 117–159.

Argus bare-eye
Endemic birds of Colombia
Argus bare-eye
Argus bare-eye
Taxonomy articles created by Polbot
Taxobox binomials not recognized by IUCN